Sergei Nikolaevich Alphéraky (14 April 1850 – 1919?) (sometimes Alphéraki or Alferaki) was a Russian ornithologist and entomologist who specialised in Lepidoptera.

Sergei Alphéraky was born in Kharkov into the noble Greek family of Alferakis and was the brother of composer Achilles Alferaki. His father Nikos Alferakis owned the Alferaki Palace in Taganrog. Sergei studied at Moscow University (1867–1869), then with Otto Staudinger in Dresden (1871–1873). He also studied taxidermy techniques in Paris from Émile Deyrolle. On his return to Russia he worked on the Lepidoptera of the Taganrog, Rostov-on-Don region. He also collected in the North Caucasus. After that he devoted himself to the insects, especially Lepidoptera, of Central Asia. He worked on the Lepidoptera collected by Nikolai Przhevalsky in Tibet held by the Zoological Museum of the Russian Academy of Science and those collected by Grigorij Nikolaevich Potanin in China and Mongolia in the same institution. Later he studied the collections made by Alfred Otto Herz in Amur, Korea and Kamchatka, and those of Nicholas Mikhailovich Romanoff (Grand Duke Nicholas Mikhailovich), a friend from his two years at Moscow University. He was an honorary member of both the Russian Entomological Society and the Royal Entomological Society of London.

Alphéraky was arrested in Petrograd during the Russian revolution in 1917 and according to some sources he was shot dead right there while others believe he was imprisoned and shot in 1919.

Works
Partial list
1875–1878. Cheshuekrylyya (Lepidoptera) okrestnostei Taganroga (The Butterflies (Lepidoptera) of the environs of Taganrog) Trudy RusskagoEntomologicheskago obshchestva, 8: 150–226 (1875); 10: 35–53 (1876); 11: 45–50 (1878) (in Russian).
1881–1883. Lépidoptères du district de Kouldjà et des montagnes environ-nantes. Horae Societatis Entomologicae Rossica, 16: 334–435, (1881); 17: 15–103 (1882), 156–227 (1883) (in French).
Lépidoptères rapportés du Thibet par le Général N.M. Przewalsky de son voyage de 1884-1885. Mémoires sur les Lépidoptères, 5: 59-80 Edited by Nicholas Mikhailovich Romanoff. 1889
1905. The Geese of Europe and Asia. London, Rowland Ward. 1905. 24 plates by Frederick William Frohawk. Also a Russian version.
1908. Cheshuekryle Okrenestei Taganroga (The Butterflies of the environs of Taganrog). Supplément III. Horae Societatis Entomologicae Rossica, 38:558–618 (in French and Russian).

Notes

References
Korolev, Vladimir A. & Murzin, Vladimir S. (January 30, 2008). "Alphéraky, Sergei Nikolaevich (1850-1918)". Российская наука и мир.

External links
Genera of moths described by Alphéraky. Butterflies and Moths of the World. Natural History Museum, London. Retrieved December 6, 2017.
The geese of Europe and Asia (1905)

Russian lepidopterists
1850 births
1918 deaths
Biologists from the Russian Empire
Russian people of Greek descent
Date of birth missing
Date of death missing
19th-century scientists from the Russian Empire
20th-century Russian scientists
Russian ornithologists
19th-century Greek scientists
20th-century Greek scientists